Levy Mkandawire (5 May 1961 – 18 November 2021) was a Zambian politician from the United Party for National Development who served as Mayor of Lusaka and Member of Parliament for the Kabwata constituency.

Death 
He was run over and killed outside his home in November 2021. In June 2022, a man pleaded guilty for causing death by dangerous driving. He was succeeded in a by-election by Andrew Tayengwa.

References 

1961 births
2021 deaths
Mayors of Lusaka

United Party for National Development politicians
Members of the National Assembly of Zambia
21st-century Zambian politicians
Road incident deaths in Zambia
Accidental deaths in Zambia